The 1997 Sudirman Cup was the fifth tournament of the World Mixed Team Badminton Championships. It was held from May 19 to May 25, 1997 in Glasgow, Scotland.

Results
59 teams competed in this edition of Sudirman Cup. Nigeria, Morocco, Turkmenistan, Uganda and Zambia also entered, but ultimately did not participate.

Group 1

Subgroup 1A

Subgroup 1B

Semi-finals

Relegation playoff

Final

Group 2

Subgroup 2A

Subgroup 2B

Playoff

Group 3

Subgroup 3A

Subgroup 3B

Playoff

Group 4

Subgroup 4A

Subgroup 4B

Playoff

Group 5

Subgroup 5A

Subgroup 5B

Playoff

Group 6

Subgroup 6A

Subgroup 6B

Playoff

Group 7

Subgroup 7A

Subgroup 7B

Playoff

Group 8

Final classification

References

Sudirman Cup
Sudirman Cup
Sudirman Cup